Symphonic Holocaust is an album by progressive rock band Morte Macabre. The band is made up of Anekdoten and Landberk members.

Track listing
"Apoteosi del Mistero" – 4:16
"Threats of Stark Reality" – 2:59
"Sequenza ritmica e tema" – 7:02
"Lullaby" – 8:02
"Quiet Drops" – 6:43
"Opening Theme" – 2:50
"The Photosession" – 7:10
"Symphonic Holocaust" – 17:51

Personnel
 Nicklas Berg (Anekdoten) — Mellotron, Fender Rhodes, Theremin, sampler, guitar, bass
 Stefan Dimle (Landberk) — bass, Mellotron, Moog
 Reine Fiske (Landberk) — guitar, Mellotron, violin, Fender Rhodes
 Peter Nordins (Anekdoten) — drums, percussion, Mellotron

References

1998 albums